Rising is the third live album, and twentieth album overall, from British singer-songwriter Donovan. It was released on Permanent Records in 1990 (LP and CD). The live versions of Donovan's hits guaranteed that Rising would receive a release in both the United States and United Kingdom. Rising was retitled The Classics Live in the United States, 25 Years in Concert in Europe and Atlantis in the UK for marketing reasons. Since the release of Rising, there have been many reissues of the songs from the album under many different titles.

Rising was supposedly recorded sporadically from 1982 through 1986 at various live concerts during different world tours. However, after careful research the songs on the album came from are revealed as a U.S. tour in 1971 and from the Cambridge Folk Festival of 1981.

History
Although Donovan's albums had all but disappeared from the British and American markets by the early 1980s, his live appearances still attracted large audiences. Donovan toured constantly throughout this time, performing throughout North America and Europe.

The setlists from these shows features a mixture of Donovan's international hits from the 1960s and relatively more obscure tracks from his later albums. Like most of Donovan's live performances, there is sparse instrumentation accompanying Donovan's vocals, including flute, acoustic guitar, bass. Rising features two traditional songs ("Young But Growing" and "Stealing") and one original song ("Love Will Find a Way") that were not released on any previous Donovan album.

In 2001, Rising was expanded to a two-CD set as Rising Again.

Track listing
All tracks by Donovan Leitch, except where noted.

"Young But Growing", "Stealing" and "Love Will Find a Way" are previously unreleased compositions. All recordings previously unreleased except for "Sadness" and "Universal Soldier" (see Live in Japan: Spring Tour 1973)

Original album
The vinyl release has 15 tracks, the CD release has 18 tracks
"Jennifer Juniper" – 2:25
"Catch the Wind" – 2:50
"Hurdy Gurdy Man" – 6:04
"Sunshine Superman" – 3:57
"Sadness" – 2:56
"Universal Soldier" (Buffy Sainte-Marie) – 2:49
"Cosmic Wheels" (CD bonus track) – 4:05
"Atlantis" – 3:06
"Wear Your Love Like Heaven" – 2:17
"To Susan On the West Coast Waiting" – 1:39
"Colours" – 2:29
"Young Girl Blues" – 5:01
"Young But Growing" (traditional; arranged by Donovan)  (CD bonus track) – 3:41
"Stealing" (traditional; arranged by Donovan) – 4:10
"Sailing Homeward" – 3:04
"Love Will Find a Way" – 2:44
"Laléna" – 3:16
"Make Up Your Mind" (CD bonus track) – 5:28

Further song information
 "Sadness" (the studio version was released on 7-Tease, November 1974)
 "Young Girl Blues" (the studio version was released on Mellow Yellow, March 1967)
 "Sailing Homeward" (the studio version was released on Essence to Essence, December 1973)
 "Make Up Your Mind" (The studio version of was released as "Life is a Merry-Go-Round" on Essence to Essence)

Personnel 
Donovan – Guitar, Harmonica, composer, Vocals
Patrick Hehir – Producer, engineer
Paul Horn – Clarinet, Flute, Saxophone
Peter Mark – Viola
Barbara Nessim – Illustrations, Cover Design
Danny Thompson – Bass
Mixed by Richard Nathan

Release history
A list of reissues

References

External links
 Rising – Donovan Unofficial Site
Allmusic review: The Classics Live, by Nathan Bush  [ link]
 Allmusic review   [ The Very Best of Donovan [Artful]]
 Allmusic review   [ link Performance]

1990 live albums
Donovan live albums